Western Australian soccer clubs from the top three State-Based Divisions competed in 2011 for the WA State Challenge Cup, known that year as the State League Cup.  This knockout competition was won by Sorrento, their first title.

First round
A total of 32 teams took part in this stage of the competition. All 12 Clubs from the State League Premier Division and Football West State League Division 1, and 8 clubs from the Sunday League (Premier Division) entered into the competition at this stage.
All matches were completed by 30 March 2011.

The draw was as follows:

Second round
A total of 16 teams took part in this stage of the competition. All matches were completed by 27 April 2011.

The draw was as follows:

Quarter finals
A total of 8 teams took part in this stage of the competition.  All matches in this round were completed on 6 June 2011.

The draw was as follows:

Semi finals
A total of 4 teams took part in this stage of the competition. All matches in this round were completed by 10 July 2011.

The draw was as follows:

Final
The 2011 State League Cup Final was held at the neutral venue of Macedonia Park on 25 August.

References

External links

Football West State Cup
2011 in Australian soccer